The discography of Will Young, an English singer who rose to fame when he won the first series of Pop Idol in 2001 contains eight studio albums, four compilation albums, two extended plays (EPs), thirty-three singles, and twenty-eight music videos. Young's debut single was a double A-side, "Evergreen" and "Anything Is Possible", released in 2002. This became the fastest-selling debut single in UK chart history going straight to number one and going on to sell over 1.8 million copies. In the Top 40 Biggest Selling Singles of the 21st Century (so far) published by the Official Charts Company, "Evergreen" topped the list. In October 2002 Young released his debut album, From Now On, which included "Evergreen" and "Anything Is Possible", "Light My Fire", "The Long and Winding Road" (a duet with Gareth Gates, released as a double A-side with Gates's song "Suspicious Minds") and "Don't Let Me Down"/"You and I" (released in aid of Children in Need). 

Young's second album Friday's Child was released in December 2003. It features the singles "Leave Right Now", "Your Game" and "Friday's Child". In November 2005 Young released his third album, Keep On, which included the singles "All Time Love", "Switch It On" and "Who Am I". In September 2008 Young's fourth album, Let It Go was released and it peaked at number two. Singles released were "Changes", "Grace", "Let It Go" and "Tell Me the Worst".

Young released his first greatest hits collection, The Hits, in November 2009, a compilation of his greatest singles between 2002 and 2009, including two brand new compositions. His fifth studio album, Echoes, released 22 August 2011 became his first number-one album since 2003, producing four singles. His sixth studio album, 85% Proof, was released on 25 May 2015 on Island Records, which he signed to in 2012. After a four-year break, Lexicon was released on 21 June 2019. Young's latest, his eighth studio album Crying on the Bathroom Floor was released on 6 August 2021. All of Young's studio albums have debuted in the top 3 of the UK Albums Chart.

Albums

Studio albums

Compilation albums

Video albums
Will Young Live (7 April 2003)
Live in London (21 March 2005)

Extended plays

Singles

Promotional singles

Other appearances

Notes

References

External links
 Discography on Will Young's official website

Discographies of British artists
Pop music discographies